All Light is the debut Korean-language studio album by South Korean boy band Astro. It was released on January 16, 2019, through Fantagio Music. The album was released following a hiatus due to internal issues at their label. It debuted atop the Gaon Album Chart and reached the top 10 of the US Billboard World Albums chart.

Background
The lead single from the album, "All Night", was called a "soulful dance track" with a "snapping beat guided by groovy synths", a "dynamic beat drop" and a "rhythmic chorus" by Billboard. It was described as showing a "mature" side to the group. The song's lyrics are about a man wanting to talk on the phone "all night" with his love interest. The rest of the album features ballads, as well as electronic pop and dance songs.

Promotion
The album was teased through concept videos posted by the band's members on social media.

Track listing

Charts

Accolades

Sales

See also
 List of Gaon Album Chart number ones of 2019

References

2019 albums
Astro (South Korean band) albums
Korean-language albums